The Black Death was a bubonic plague pandemic, which reached England in June 1348. It was the first and most severe manifestation of the second pandemic, caused by Yersinia pestis bacteria. The term Black Death was not used until the late 17th century.

Originating in Asia, it spread west along the trade routes across Europe and arrived on the British Isles from the English province of Gascony. The plague was spread by flea-infected rats, as well as individuals who had been infected on the continent. Rats were the reservoir hosts of the Y. pestis bacteria and the Oriental rat flea was the primary vector.

The first-known case in England was a seaman who arrived at Weymouth, Dorset, from Gascony in June 1348. By autumn, the plague had reached London, and by summer 1349 it covered the entire country, before dying down by December. Low estimates of mortality in the early twentieth century have been revised upwards due to re-examination of data and new information, and a figure of 40–60 percent of the population is widely accepted.

The most immediate consequence was a halt to the campaigns of the Hundred Years' War. In the long term, the decrease in population caused a shortage of labour, with subsequent rise in wages, resisted by the landowners, which caused deep resentment among the lower classes. The Peasants' Revolt of 1381 was largely a result of this resentment, and even though the rebellion was suppressed, in the long term serfdom was ended in England. The Black Death also affected artistic and cultural efforts, and may have helped advance the use of the vernacular.

In 1361–62 the plague returned to England, this time causing the death of around 20 per cent of the population. After this the plague continued to return intermittently throughout the 14th and 15th centuries, in local or national outbreaks. From this point on its effect became less severe, and one of the last outbreaks of the plague in England was the Great Plague of London in 1665–1666.

Background

England in the mid-14th century

It is impossible to establish with any certainty the exact number of inhabitants in England at the eve of the Black Death, and estimates range from 3 to 7 million. The number is probably in the higher end, and an estimate of around 6 million inhabitants seems likely. Earlier demographic crises—in particular the Great Famine of 1315–1317—had resulted in great numbers of deaths, but there is no evidence of any significant decrease in the population prior to 1348. England was still a predominantly rural and agrarian society; close to 90 per cent of the population lived in the countryside. Of the major cities, London was in a class of its own, with perhaps as many as 70,000 inhabitants. Further down the scale were Norwich, with around 12,000 people, and York with around 10,000. The main export, and the source of the nation's wealth, was wool. Until the middle of the century the export had consisted primarily of raw wool to cloth makers in Flanders. Gradually though, the technology for cloth making used on the Continent was appropriated by English manufacturers, who started an export of cloths around mid-century that would boom over the following decades.

Politically, the kingdom was evolving into a major European power, through the youthful and energetic kingship of Edward III. In 1346, the English had won a decisive battle over the Scots at the Battle of Neville's Cross, and it seemed that Edward III would realise his grandfather Edward I's ambition of bringing the Scots under the suzerainty of the English crown. The English were also experiencing military success on the continent. Less than two months before the Battle of Neville's Cross, a numerically inferior English army led by the king himself won a spectacular victory over the French royal forces at the Battle of Crécy. The victory was immediately followed by Edward laying siege to the port city of Calais. When the city fell the next year, this provided the English with a strategically important enclave that would remain in their possession for over two centuries.

The Black Death

The term "Black Death"—which refers to the first and most serious outbreak of the second pandemic—was not used by contemporaries, who preferred such names as the "Great Pestilence" or the "Great Mortality". It was not until the 17th century that the term under which we know the outbreak today became common, probably derived from Scandinavian languages. It is generally agreed today that the disease in question was plague, caused by Yersinia pestis bacteria. These bacteria are carried by fleas, which can be transferred to humans through contact with rats. Flea bites carry the disease into the lymphatic system, through which it makes its way to the lymph nodes. Here the bacteria multiply and form swellings called buboes, from which the term bubonic plague is derived. After three or four days the bacteria enter the bloodstream, and infect organs such as the spleen and the lungs. The patient will then normally die after a few days. A different strain of the disease is pneumonic plague, where the bacteria become airborne and enter directly into the patient's lungs. This strain is far more virulent, as it spreads directly from person to person. These types of infection probably both played a significant part in the Black Death, while a third strain was more rare. This is the septicaemic plague, where the flea bite carries the bacteria directly into the blood stream, and death occurs very rapidly.

A study reported in 2011 of skeletons exhumed from the Black Death cemetery in East Smithfield, London, found Yersinia pestis DNA. An archaeological dig in the vicinity of Thornton Abbey in Lincolnshire was reported in the science section of The Guardian for 30 November 2016, not only confirming evidence of the Y. pestis DNA in the human remains exhumed there but also dating the remains to mid-1349.

Genotyping showed that it was [at that time] a newly evolved strain, ancestor of all modern strains and proved the Black Death was bubonic plague. Modern medical knowledge suggests that because it was a new strain, the human immune system would have had little or no defence against it, helping to explain the plague's virulence and high death rates.

The Black Death seems to have originated in Central Asia, where the Y. pestis bacterium is endemic in the rodent population. It is unknown exactly what caused the outbreak, but a series of natural occurrences likely brought humans into contact with the infected rodents. The epidemic reached Constantinople in the late spring of 1347, through Genoese merchants trading in the Black Sea. From here it reached Sicily in October that same year, and by early 1348 it had spread over the entire Italian mainland. It spread rapidly through France, and had reached as far north as Paris by June 1348. Moving simultaneously westward, it arrived in the English province of Gascony around the same time.

Progress of the plague

According to the chronicle of the grey friars at King's Lynn, the plague arrived by ship from Gascony to Melcombe in Dorset—today normally referred to as Weymouth—shortly before the Feast of St. John the Baptist on 24 June 1348. Other sources mention different points of arrival, including Bristol and Southampton. Though the plague might have arrived independently at Bristol at a later point, the Grey Friars' Chronicle is considered the most authoritative account. If it is assumed that the chronicle reports the first outbreak of the plague, rather than its actual arrival, then the arrival most likely happened around 8 May.

From Weymouth the disease spread rapidly across the south-west. The first major city to be struck was Bristol. The disease reached London in the autumn of 1348, before most of the surrounding countryside. This had certainly happened by November, though according to some accounts as early as 29 September. Arrival in London happened by three principal roads: overland from Weymouth—through Salisbury and Winchester—overland from Gloucester, and along the coast by ship. The full effect of the plague was felt in the capital early the next year. Conditions in London were ideal for the plague: the streets were narrow and flowing with sewage, and houses were overcrowded and poorly ventilated. By March 1349 the disease was spreading haphazardly across all of southern England.

During the first half of 1349 the Black Death spread northwards. A second front opened up when the plague arrived by ship at the Humber, after which it spread both south and north. In May it reached York, and during the summer months of June, July and August, it ravaged the north. Certain northern counties, like Durham and Cumberland, had been the victim of violent incursions from the Scots, and were therefore left particularly vulnerable to the devastations of the plague. Pestilence is less virulent during the winter months, and spreads less rapidly. The Black Death in England had survived the winter of 1348–49, but during the following winter it gave in, and by December 1349 conditions were returning to relative normality. It had taken the disease approximately 500 days to traverse the entire country.

Medical practice
Various methods were used including sweating, bloodletting, forced vomiting and urinating to treat patients infected with the plague. Several symptoms of the illness included blotches, hardening of the glands under the groin and underarms, and dementia. Within the initial phase of the disease, bloodletting was performed on the same side of where the physical manifestations of the buboes or risings appeared. For instance, if a rising appeared on the right side of the groin the physician would bleed a vein in the ankle on the same side. In the case of sweating, it was achieved with such medicines as Mithridate, Venice-Treacle, Matthiolus, Bezoar-Water, Serpentary Roots and Electuarium de Ovo. Sweating was used when measures were desperate; if a patient had tokens, a severe version of risings, the physician would wrap the naked patient in a blanket drenched in cold water. This measure was only performed while the patient still had natural heat in his system. The desired effect was to make the patient sweat violently and thus purge all corruption from the blood which was caused by the disease.

Another practice was the use of pigeons when treating swellings. Swellings which were white in appearance and deep were unlikely to break and were anointed with Oil of Lillies or Camomil. Once the swelling rose to a head and was red in appearance and not deep in the flesh, it was broken with the use of a feather from a young pigeon's tail. The feather's fundament was held to the swelling and would draw out the venom. However, if the swelling dropped and became black in appearance, the physician had to be cautious when drawing the cold from the swelling. If it was too late to prevent, the physician would take the young pigeon, cut it open from breast to back, break it open and apply the pigeon (while still alive) over the cold swelling. The cupping therapy was an alternative method which was heated and then placed over the swellings. Once the sore was broken, the physician would apply Mellilot Plaister with Linimentum Arcei and heal the sore with digence.

Victims

Death toll
Although historical records for England were more extensive than those of any other European country, it is still extremely difficult to establish the death toll with any degree of certainty. Difficulties involve uncertainty about the size of the total population, as described above, but also issues regarding the proportion of the population that died from the plague. Contemporary accounts are often grossly inflated, stating numbers as high as 90 per cent. Modern historians give estimates of death rates ranging from around 25 per cent to more than 60 per cent of the total population.

The pioneering work in the field was made by Josiah William Russell in his 1948 British Medieval Population. Russell looked at inquisitions post mortem (IPMs)—taken by the crown to assess the wealth of the greatest landowners after their death—to assess the mortality caused by the Black Death, and from this arrived at an estimate of 23.6 per cent of the entire population. He also looked at episcopal registers for the death toll among the clergy, where the result was between 30 and 40 per cent. Russell believed the clergy was at particular risk of contagion, and eventually concluded with a low mortality level of only 20 per cent.

Several of Russell's assumptions have been challenged, and the tendency since has been to adjust the assessment upwards. Philip Ziegler, in 1969, estimated the death rate to be at around one third of the population. Jeremy Goldberg, in 1996, believed a number closer to 45 per cent would be more realistic. A 2004 study by Ole Jørgen Benedictow suggests the exceptionally high mortality level of 62.5 per cent. Assuming a population of 6 million, this estimate would correspond to 3,750,000 deaths. Such a high percentage would place England above the average that Benedictow estimates for Western Europe as a whole, of 60 per cent. A death rate at such a high level has not been universally accepted in the historical community.

In 2016, Carenza Lewis reported the results of a new method of assessing the death toll. She argued that pottery before and after the Black Death is datable because there was a change at that time from the high medieval to the late medieval style, and that counts of pottery of each type therefore provide a useful proxy for long term changes in population. She and her colleagues analysed pottery sherds from test pits in more than 50 continuously occupied rural settlements in eastern England, and found a decline in the number of pottery producing pits of 45 per cent. Norfolk had the greatest drop of 65 per cent, while there was no drop in 10 per cent of settlements, mostly commercial centres.

Impact of the Black Death: 1349
Archbishop Zouche of York issued a warning throughout the diocese in July 1348 (when the epidemic was raging further south) of "great mortalities, pestilences and infections of the air".

The Great Mortality, as it was then known, entered Yorkshire around February 1349 and quickly spread through the diocese. The clergy were on the front line of the disease, bringing comfort to the dying, hearing final confessions and organising burials. This, almost by necessity, put them at a greater risk of infection.

Estimates suggest that the death rate of clergy in some parts of the archdiocese could have been as high as 48 per cent. This is reflected in the Ordination Register, which shows a massive rise in ordained clergy over the period—some being recruited before the arrival of plague in a clerical recruitment drive, but many once plague had arrived, replacing those who had been killed. In 1346, 111 priests and 337 acolytes were recruited. In 1349, 299 priests and 683 acolytes are named, with 166 priests being ordained in one session alone in February 1350."

Social distribution
Russell had trusted the IPMs to give a true picture of the national average, because he assumed death rates to be relatively equal across the social spectrum. This assumption has been proven wrong, and studies of peasant plague mortality from manor rolls have returned much higher rates. This could be a consequence of the elite's ability to avoid infection by escaping plague-infected areas. It could also result from lower post-infection mortality among those more affluent, due to better access to care and nursing. If so, this would also mean that the mortality rates for the clergy—who were normally better off than the general population—were no higher than the average.

The manorial records offer a good opportunity to study the geographical distribution of the plague. Its effect seems to have been about the same all over England, though a place like East Anglia, which had frequent contact with the Continent, was severely affected. On a local level, however, there were great variations. A study of the Bishop of Worcester's estates reveal that, while his manors of Hartlebury and Hanbury had a mortality of only 19 per cent, the manor of Aston lost as much as 80 per cent of its population. The manor rolls are less useful for studying the demographic distribution of the mortality, since the rolls only record the heads of households, normally an adult male. Here the IPMs show us that the most vulnerable to the disease were infants and the elderly.

There seem to have been relatively few deaths from the Black Death at higher levels of society. The only member of the royal family who can be said with any certainty to have died from the Black Death was in France at the time of her infection. Edward III's daughter Joan was residing in Bordeaux on her way to marry Pedro of Castile in the summer of 1348. When the plague broke out in her household she was moved to a small village nearby, but she could not avoid infection, and died there on 2 September. It is possible that the popular religious author Richard Rolle, who died on 30 September 1349, was another victim of the Black Death. The English philosopher William of Ockham has been mentioned as a plague victim. This, however, is an impossibility. Ockham was living in Munich at the time of his death, on 10 April 1347, two years before the Black Death reached that city.

Consequences

Economic, social and political effects
Among the most immediate consequences of the Black Death in England was a shortage of farm labour, and a corresponding rise in wages. The medieval world-view was unable to interpret these changes in terms of socio-economic development, and it became common to blame degrading morals instead. The landowning classes saw the rise in wage levels as a sign of social upheaval and insubordination, and reacted with coercion. In 1349, King Edward III passed the Ordinance of Labourers, fixing wages at pre-plague levels. The ordinance was reinforced by Parliament's passing of the Statute of Labourers in 1351. The labour laws were enforced with ruthless determination over the following decades.

These legislative measures proved largely inefficient at regulating the market, but the government's repressive measures to enforce them caused public resentment. These conditions were contributing factors to the Peasants' Revolt in 1381. The revolt started in Kent and Essex in late May, and once the rebels reached London they burnt down John of Gaunt's Savoy Palace, and killed both the Chancellor and the Treasurer. They then demanded the complete abolition of serfdom, and were not pacified until the young King Richard II personally intervened. The rebellion was eventually suppressed, but the social changes it promoted were already irreversible. By around 1400 serfdom was virtually extinct in England, replaced by the form of tenure called copyhold.

It is conspicuous how well the English government handled the crisis of the mid-fourteenth century, without descending into chaos and total collapse in the manner of the Valois government of France. To a large extent this was the accomplishment of administrators such as Treasurer William de Shareshull and Chief Justice William Edington, whose highly competent leadership guided the governance of the nation through the crisis. The plague's greatest effect on the government was probably in the field of war, where no major campaigns were launched in France until 1355.

Another notable consequence of the Black Death was the raising of the real wage of England (due to the shortage of labour as a result of the reduction in population), a trait shared across Western Europe, which in general led to a real wage in 1450 that was unmatched in most countries until the 19th or 20th century. The higher wages for workers combined with sinking prices on grain products led to a problematic economic situation for the gentry. As a result, they started to show an increased interest for offices like justice of the peace, sheriff and member of parliament. The gentry took advantage of their new positions and a more systematic corruption than before spread. A result of this was that the gentry as a group became highly disliked by commoners.

Religious and cultural consequences
The omnipresence of death also inspired greater piety in the upper classes, which can be seen in the fact that three Cambridge colleges were founded during or shortly after the Black Death. England did not experience the same trend of roving bands of flagellants, common on the continent. Neither were there any pogroms against the Jews, since the Jews had been expelled by Edward I in 1290. 

The high rate of mortality among the clergy naturally led to a shortage of priests in many parts of the country. The clergy were seen to have an elevated status among ordinary people and this was partly due to their purported closeness with God, being his envoys on earth. However, as the church itself had given the cause of the Black Death to be the impropriety of the behaviour of men, the higher death rate among the clergy led the people to lose faith in the Church as an institution—it had proved as ineffectual against the horror of Y. pestis as every other medieval institution. The corruption within the Catholic priesthood also angered the English people. Many priests abandoned the terrified people. Others sought benefits from the rich families who needed burials. The dissatisfaction led to anti-clericalism and the rise of John Wycliffe, an English priest. His ideas paved a path for the Christian reformation in England. Some people didn't lose their Christian faith, if anything it was renewed; they began to long for a more personal relationship with God—around the time after the Black Death many chantries (private chapels) began to spread in use from not just the nobility, but to among the well-to-do. This change in the power of the papacy in England is demonstrated by the statutes of Praemunire.

The Black Death also affected arts and culture significantly. It was inevitable that a catastrophe of such proportions would affect some of the greater building projects, as the amount of available labour fell sharply. The building of the cathedrals of Ely and Exeter was temporarily halted in the years immediately following the first outbreak of the plague. The shortage of labour also helped advance the transition from the Decorated style of building to the less elaborate Perpendicular style. The Black Death may also have promoted the use of vernacular English, as the number of teachers proficient in French dwindled, contributing to the late-14th-century flowering of English literature, represented by writers such as Geoffrey Chaucer and John Gower.

Recurrences

The Black Death was the first occurrence of the second pandemic, which continued to strike England and the rest of Europe more or less regularly until the 18th century. The first serious recurrence in England came in the years 1361−62. Little is known about the death rates caused by these later outbreaks, but the so-called pestis secunda may have had a mortality of around 20 per cent. Genetic analysis performed on remains recovered from the abbey of St. Mary's Graces dating between 1353 and 1364 found the pPCP1 plasmid, a plasmid only found in Yersinia pestis and not the related environmental agent Yersinia pseudotuberculosis, revealing that this outbreak was also caused by Yersinia pestis just as the initial outbreak had been. This epidemic was also particularly devastating for the population's ability to recover, since it disproportionately affected infants and young men. This was also the case with the next occurrence, in 1369, where the death rate was around 10−15 per cent.

Over the following decades the plague would return—on a national or a regional level—at intervals of five to 12 years, with gradually dwindling death tolls. Then, in the decades from 1430 to 1480, the disease returned in force. An outbreak in 1471 took as much as 10–15 per cent of the population, while the death rate of the plague of 1479–80 could have been as high as 20 per cent. From that point outbreaks became fewer and more manageable, due largely to conscious efforts by central and local governments—from the late 15th century onward—to curtail the disease. This included quarantines on people and goods coming from infected places, bans on public gatherings (such as fairs), enforced household quarantine for the infected (known as 'locking up') and quarantines on ships and crews coming from ports where Plague outbreaks had occurred. From the early seventeenth century there was also greater use of quarantine facilities, called pesthouses, in preference to household quarantine. Some of these, such as the Forlorn Hope Pesthouse established by Bristol in 1665–6, appear to have been proper quarantine hospitals, staffed by doctors. The establishment of such a hospital may help to explain why the death rate in Bristol in the 1665–66 outbreak was "only" c.0.6 percent. This was much lower than the mortality rate of 10–20 percent witnessed in Bristol's Plague epidemics of 1565, 1575, 1603–04 and 1645. The Great Plague of 1665–66 was the last major outbreak in England. It is best known for the famous Great Plague of London, which killed 100,000 people (20 per cent of the population) in the capital. Other places hit hard included Eyam in Derbyshire, Derby itself and Norwich.

See also

 Globalization and disease
 Abandoned village
 Population decline
 Medieval demography
 Crisis of the Late Middle Ages
 Popular revolts in late-medieval Europe
 List of epidemics

References

Sources

Further reading
 
Doomsday Book by Connie Willis, a science fiction novel, where the protagonist by accident travels back in time to the year 1348 and is confronted with the progress of the Black Death in southern England.

14th-century health disasters
14th century in England
England
Death in England
Disease outbreaks in England
Edward III of England